Anestis Dalakouras (born 18 June 1993) is a Greek international volleyball player, with the Greece men's national volleyball team. On club level he plays for Olympiacos.

Honours

Club
 2022–23  CEV Challenge Cup, with Olympiacos Piraeus

References

External links
 Anestis Dalakouras at International Volleyball Federation
 

1993 births
Living people
Greek men's volleyball players
Olympiacos S.C. players
Place of birth missing (living people)
Competitors at the 2018 Mediterranean Games
Mediterranean Games bronze medalists for Greece
Mediterranean Games medalists in volleyball
Sportspeople from Alexandroupolis